Patapsco, Maryland may refer to:

 Patapsco, Anne Arundel County, Maryland
 Patapsco, Carroll County, Maryland